Josh Pederson (born September 22, 1997) is an American football tight end for the Houston Gamblers of the United States Football League (USFL). He played college football at UL Monroe. He is the son of current Jacksonville Jaguars coach Doug Pederson.

Early life and education
Josh Pederson was born on September 22, 1997, in Newark, New Jersey, and was raised in New Jersey as well as Kansas. He went to high school at Blue Valley North, where he had 73 receptions for 1,102 yards and 16 touchdowns in two seasons. He was rated as a two-star recruit out of high school, and committed to playing college football at Louisiana–Monroe. He spent his first season as a redshirt.

In Pederson's second year, he was a redshirt-freshman, and played in 11 games, registering 12 catches for 136 yards. He played in 11 games the following year as well, making 12 catches for the second straight year.

In his junior year, Pederson was named First-team All-Sun Belt after posting 43 receptions for 567 yards and 9 scores.

He started every game his senior year, and recorded 32 catches for 367 yards.

Professional career

San Francisco 49ers
Pederson went unselected in the 2021 NFL Draft and was subsequently signed as an undrafted free agent by the San Francisco 49ers. On August 4, 2021, Pederson was waived by the 49ers.

New Orleans Saints
On August 6, 2021, Pederson signed with the New Orleans Saints. He was waived on August 21.

Kansas City Chiefs
On February 11, 2022, Pederson signed a reserve/future contract with the Kansas City Chiefs. He was waived on May 5, 2022.

Houston Gamblers
Pederson signed with the Houston Gamblers of the United States Football League on May 20, 2022, and was subsequently transferred to the team's inactive roster.

Personal life
Pederson is the son of Jacksonville Jaguars coach Doug Pederson. After Doug was fired by the Eagles after the 2020 season, Josh said that he felt "no hard feelings" towards them and would welcome joining the Eagles.

References

External links
Louisiana–Monroe Warhawks football bio

1997 births
Living people
American football tight ends
Louisiana–Monroe Warhawks football players
New Orleans Saints players
San Francisco 49ers players
Kansas City Chiefs players
Houston Gamblers (2022) players
Players of American football from Newark, New Jersey